Thionazin is a chemical compound used in nematicides.

References

Organothiophosphate esters
Pyrazines
Nematicides